Mussasa was a 17th-century Jaga queen.

Biography 
Mussasa was the wife of Donji, the governor of Matamba. Mussasa was known to be a fierce warrior and even to rival men of her time. Soon after the death of the King Zimbo, Mussasa's husband Donji began to take over his neighboring states. Mussasa soon after the death of her husband, continued the domination and extended her empire. Her nation was on the Cunene river in what is now Angola. She expanded her empire greatly through her military, and led soldiers into battle. Mussusa educated her daughter Tembandumba to be a soldier and took her to fight side by side in battle. Tembandumba, who developed a reputation of being as fierce as her mother, succeeded Mussasa as queen.

References

"The Amazons: Chapter VII: Amazons of Africa" URL accessed 08/04/06
Female warriors : memorials of female valour and heroism, Clayton, Ellen C. (Ellen Creathorne), 1834-1900.:

External links

17th-century monarchs in Africa
17th-century women rulers
Women rulers in Africa
Queens regnant in Africa
African women in war
Women in 17th-century warfare
17th century in Angola